The 2012 Sicilian regional election for the renewal of the Sicilian Regional Assembly and the election of the President of Sicily was held on 28 October 2012. It was a snap election, following the resignation of President Raffaele Lombardo for judicial and financial reasons.

The election was competed by ten candidates from newly reshuffled political alliances, and was an unusually close race. The winner of the election was Rosario Crocetta, candidate for a centre-left coalition of Democratic Party and the Union of the Centre.

Candidates
 Nello Musumeci: a long-time Member of European Parliament and former 2006 election candidate, heads a "regular" centre-right coalition formed by The People of Freedom (PdL) and The Right (LD), the latter being the party of Musumeci;
 Gianfranco Micciché: a former minister for Development, deputy minister for Economy and - most recently - state undersecretary in several cabinets of Silvio Berlusconi, will lead a Sicilianist (pro-autonomy) coalition formed by Raffaele Lombardo's Movement for the Autonomies (MpA), renamed Party of Sicilians for the occasion, Micciché's own party Great South (GS), and the regional section of Future and Freedom (FLI).
 Rosario Crocetta: Member of European Parliament and former Mayor of Gela, will be the candidate of a moderate centre-left coalition formed by Crocetta's Democratic Party (PD) and the Union of the Centre (UdC);
 Giovanna Marano: a Sicilian trade union leader, leads a left-wing coalition made of Left Ecology Freedom (SEL), Italy of Values (IdV), the Federation of the Left (FdS) and the Federation of the Greens (FdV). She was put in place of original candidate Claudio Fava after the latter failed to move his residence to Sicily in time;
 Giancarlo Cancellieri: leading member candidate for the Sicilian wing of Beppe Grillo's Five Star Movement (M5S). His candidacy was extensively supported by Grillo himself, who reached the island swimming across the Strait of Messina and then campaigned consecutively through the island for the last two weeks of electoral campaign;
 Mariano Ferro: a leading member and figurehead of the 2012 Sicilian protests, runs as a candidate for the Pitchforks Movement;
 Cateno De Luca: a former Movement for the Autonomies member and outgoing Sicilian MP, runs as a candidate for his own movement Sicilian Revolution.
 Giacomo Di Leo: candidate for Workers' Communist Party (PCL);
 Gaspare Sturzo: a descendant of Italian People's Party founder Luigi Sturzo, runs as an independent candidate for "Sturzo Presidente" (Sturzo President);
 Lucia Pinsone: independent candidate for "Volontari per l'Italia" (Volunteers for Italy).

Electoral system
The Sicilian Parliament is elected with a mixed system: 80 MPs are chosen with a form of proportional representation using a largest remainder method with open lists and a 5% threshold, while 10 MPs are elected with a block voting system with closed lists.

Results

Aftermath
Following the result of the election, Crocetta was elected as president of Sicily, which turned out to be surprising in what was considered the strongest conservative stronghold of Italy. As he did not have a full majority in the Sicilian assembly, Crocetta decided to form a minority government with the support of the Five Star Movement in a number of shared legislative acts.

Notes

Elections in Sicily
2012 elections in Italy
October 2012 events in Italy